Americans in China (Chinese: 在華美國人; Pinyin: zài huá měiguó rén) are expatriates and immigrants from the United States as well as their locally born descendants. Estimates range from 72,000 (excluding Hong Kong and Macau) to

Estimated number in China
In 2005, the number of Americans living in China reached a historic high of  Most expatriates living in China come from neighboring Asian nations. An estimate published in 2018 counted 600,000 people of other nations living in China, with 12% of those from the US; that means approximately 72,000 Americans living in China.

Based on data collected in 1999, when 64,602 Americans lived in China, most lived in Hong Kong (48,220 in 1999), with smaller numbers in Beijing (10,000), Guangzhou (3,200), Shanghai (2,382), Shenyang (555) and Chengdu (800).

Hong Kong

Since the transfer of sovereignty of Hong Kong in 1997,  There are more Americans than Britons living in the territory, and 1,100 American companies employ 10% of the Hong Kong workforce.

Mainland China
According to the Sixth National Population Census of the People's Republic of China conducted in 2010, there are 71,493 Americans residing in Mainland China, the second largest single group of foreign nationals behind Koreans. Americans have been coming to China for job opportunities since 1994. In the late 2000s and early 2010s, a growing number of Americans in their 20s and 30s headed to China for employment, lured by its faster-growing economy and good pay in the financial sector. Many of them teach English, a service in demand from Chinese businesspeople and students and a growing number are arriving with skills and experience in computers, finance and other fields.

Institutions
American diplomatic missions in Mainland China:
Embassy of the United States, Beijing
U.S. Consulate General Chengdu (closed)
U.S. Consulate General Guangzhou
U.S. Consulate General Shanghai
U.S. Consulate General Shenyang
U.S. Consulate General Wuhan

The Consulate General of the United States, Hong Kong and Macau serves Hong Kong and Macau.

Education
American international schools in Mainland China:
 Beijing Saint Paul American School
 Changchun American International School
 Concordia International School Shanghai
 QSI International School of Chengdu
 Dalian American International School
 American International School of Guangzhou
 International School of Beijing
 Shanghai American School
 Shanghai Livingston American School
 Shenzhen American International School
 Suzhou North America High School

American international schools in Hong Kong:
 American International School Hong Kong
 Hong Kong International School

Notable people
 Solomon Adler - Economist
 Ai Hua (Charlotte MacInnis) - Chinese television presenter
 Elijah Coleman Bridgman - Protestant Christian missionary
 Frank Coe - United States government official
 Erwin Engst - advisor to the People's Republic to China
 Joan Hinton - nuclear physicist
 William H. Hinton - farmer and prolific writer
 Dayyan Eng - feature film director
 Isabel Ingram - tutor of Wan Rong, Empress and wife of the last Emperor of China
 Kaiser Kuo - Musician and Baidu employee
 Henry Luce - journalist and businessman
 Stephon Marbury - basketball player
 American McGee - game designer
 Gideon Nye - diplomat, art collector, and merchant
 Manya Reiss - Founding member of the Communist Party USA (CPUSA)
 Sidney Rittenberg - journalist, interpreter and scholar
 Glenn Duffie Shriver - Studied in Shanghai, arrested in the United States for attempted espionage, to which he pleaded guilty
 Agnes Smedley - journalist and writer
 Edgar Snow - journalist
 Mike Sui - comedic actor
 Anna Louise Strong - journalist and activist
 John Leighton Stuart - First President of Yenching University
 Gerald Tannebaum - humanitarian and actor

See also

 Sino-American relations
 Americans in Hong Kong
 Chinese American

References

Sources

China
 
China–United States relations
Ethnic groups in China